Pseudodiptera musiforme is a moth of the family Erebidae. It was described by William James Kaye in 1918. It is found in the Democratic Republic of the Congo and Chad.

References

Syntomini
Moths described in 1918
Insects of the Democratic Republic of the Congo
Moths of Africa